Hyderabad State Praja Party, a political party in the Hyderabad State. HSPP was formed in 1951 when Tanguturi Prakasam and Acharya N. G. Ranga broke away from the Indian National Congress.

In April 1951 Ranga broke away and formed the Krishikar Lok Party. In June the same year the HSPP of Prakasam merged with Kisan Mazdoor Praja Party.

See also
Indian National Congress breakaway parties

Defunct political parties in Telangana
Indian National Congress breakaway groups
1951 establishments in India
Political parties established in 1951
Political parties disestablished in 1951